Charles Henderson High School is a grades 9-12 high school located in the city of Troy, Alabama. The namesake of the school, Charles Henderson, was the governor of the state of Alabama from 1915 to 1919.  After his death in 1937, Henderson left some of his considerable estate to family members, but most of his money was used to establish a perpetual trust to fund education and healthcare in Troy. The fund was to be used for the construction of new schools and to start a charity hospital for children in Troy. Money from Henderson's trust has been used to fund Charles Henderson High School, Charles Henderson Middle School, and The Charles Henderson Child Health Care Center.

Lise Faison is the Principal of the high school.

Athletics

Football

The school's football team is in the 5A division of the AHSAA and participates in Region 2 (Southeast Alabama). As of November 2014, the team's state ranking is 78 and their national ranking is 2321.

The school's football team won the state championship in the Fall of 1980 in the 3A division of the AHSAA.

In 2014, a student died two days after playing in a football game.

In 2022, the Charles Henderson High School Trojans competed in the finals of the State Championship and lost in the final game.  Their coach, Coach Hambrite was name the 5A Coach of the Year following the game.

Baseball

The baseball team is in the 5-A classification. The Trojans home field is Frazier Field at Hogan's Hole. There is a blue wall in left field that is similar to the "Green Monster" at Fenway Park. In recent years, CHHS has won the Class 5A, Area 3 title in 2006, 2007, 2008, 2009, 2010 and 2012. The Trojans moved to 4A for 2013 and 2014, where they won both Area titles and State titles.

The CHHS Trojans have been ranked in every 5A Alabama High School Athletic Association Top 10 ranking for six consecutive years, from 2007 through 2012, and achieved the school's first No. 1 ranking in 2010.

In 2004, the Trojans won the 5A State Championship by defeating Cullman High School in best-of-three series.  The team finished the season with final record of 34–11.  The 2004 championship was dedicated to the late Terry Sikes, a former player for the Trojans in the late 1970s and early 1980s who coached the CHHS junior varsity baseball team. CHHS hosts the Terry Sikes Memorial Tournament every spring.

In 2008, the Trojans made it to the 5A State Championship game, where they would lose the series to Cullman High School and finished as the 5A State Runner-Up.

In 2013, CHHS went 40-3 the entire season which is a state record for winning percentage in all classifications and won the 4A State Championship by sweeping through the playoffs and beating Brooks High School in the finals. The Trojans also were ranked No. 1 in every poll that spring and are debatably the best baseball team in school history.

In 2014, the Trojans won the 4A State Championship yet again. The team had won 18 playoff games in a row before dropping game one of the state finals to Ardmore High School, then went on to take both games of the double header the following day.

CHHS is in the AHSAA record book for the following achievements:

•Third Most Homeruns in an Inning (4) vs. Brantley in 2011-Tripp Blackmon, Jalin Lawson, Chase Connell, and Gregory Barnette

•Most Consecutive Homeruns (4) vs. Brantley in 2011-Blackmon, Lawson, Connell, and Barnette

• Most and Third Most Times Hit By Pitches in a Game (9) vs. Bullock County in 2014 and (8) vs. LAMP in 2012

•Most Double Plays Turned in a Game (5) vs. Northview in 2012-Luke Hastings (3B), Michael Fox (SS), Jalin Lawson (2B), Joey Denison (1B)

Tennis

In 1992, Charles Henderson's Royce Emerson won an individual state championship after winning the #1-seed bracket in the 5A Alabama State Playoffs.  That same year, the doubles duo of Royce Emerson and Chris Giglio won the 5A doubles state championship.

In 2003 and 2004, Josh Rogers won the district championships as the #1-seed, qualifying for the state playoffs where he would fall in the Second Round both years.  He would finish ranked as the #29 junior male player in the Alabama USTA rankings.

In 2006, the team placed as runner-up in the district championship and advanced to the state playoffs.  Only #2-seed Keith Reeder and #5-seed Daniel Mount would win their First Round matches before falling in the Second Round.  Keith Reeder would finish ranked as the #48 junior male player in the Alabama USTA rankings, while fellow player Jamie Jones also finished ranked as the #76 junior player in Alabama.

The boys' tennis team has reached the state tournament nine times since 2004.

Robotics

The Charles Henderson High School BEST Robotics team was first sponsored in 2010 by the physics teacher at the time. The robotics team is in the Wiregrass BEST Hub of the BEST robotics national competition. In the years of 2010 and 2011 the robotics team made it to the South's BEST competition, which is the second stage of what is usually a three-stage competition which is in order: Hub (Wiregrass Best), Regional (South's Best), National (BEST Robotics).

Notable alumni
 Corey Dennis, head coach in college football
 Brian Meadows, professional baseball player in Major League Baseball
 Zac Etheridge, American football coach and former safety who currently serves as the safeties/secondary coach at Auburn University.

References

Public high schools in Alabama
Schools in Pike County, Alabama